Chino Valley Unified School District may refer to:

Chino Valley Unified School District (California)
Chino Valley Unified School District (Arizona)